Marsh Grove Township is a township in Marshall County, Minnesota, United States. The population was 145 at the 2000 census.

Marsh Grove Township was organized in 1884, and named for the marshes and groves within its borders.

Geography
According to the United States Census Bureau, the township has a total area of 35.8 square miles (92.7 km2), all land.

Demographics
As of the census of 2000, there were 145 people, 55 households, and 43 families residing in the township. The population density was 4.0 people per square mile (1.6/km2). There were 64 housing units at an average density of 1.8/sq mi (0.7/km2). The racial makeup of the township was 98.62% White, 0.69% African American, and 0.69% from two or more races. Hispanic or Latino of any race were 0.69% of the population.

There were 55 households, out of which 32.7% had children under the age of 18 living with them, 67.3% were married couples living together, 7.3% had a female householder with no husband present, and 21.8% were non-families. 20.0% of all households were made up of individuals, and 9.1% had someone living alone who was 65 years of age or older. The average household size was 2.64 and the average family size was 2.93.

In the township the population was spread out, with 29.0% under the age of 18, 8.3% from 18 to 24, 19.3% from 25 to 44, 24.8% from 45 to 64, and 18.6% who were 65 years of age or older. The median age was 38 years. For every 100 females, there were 107.1 males. For every 100 females age 18 and over, there were 110.2 males.

The median income for a household in the township was $35,625, and the median income for a family was $39,375. Males had a median income of $24,063 versus $21,563 for females. The per capita income for the township was $13,827. There were 15.4% of families and 15.3% of the population living below the poverty line, including 16.7% of under eighteens and 25.9% of those over 64.

References

Townships in Marshall County, Minnesota
Townships in Minnesota